The Lovingston Historic District is a national historic district located in Lovingston, Virginia, USA. It is a  historic district which includes the entirety of the 1809 and 1823 plats as well as the continued growth through the early-to-mid-20th-century. The cohesive village contains a diverse collection of building types and architectural styles that reflect the town's growth and development as the seat of Nelson County from its inception to the present. It consists of 105 properties with 176 total resources (134 contributing resources), including the Nelson County Courthouse listed separately on the National Register of Historic Places, forty-nine single dwellings, twenty-four commercial structures, six multiple dwellings, twenty-five sheds, three churches, five tavern/hotels, eleven offices, a theater, a cooper shop, a packing shed, a post office, a bank, a cemetery and two statues.

It was listed on the National Register of Historic Places in 2005.

References

Historic districts on the National Register of Historic Places in Virginia
National Register of Historic Places in Nelson County, Virginia
Geography of Nelson County, Virginia
Greek Revival architecture in Virginia
Federal architecture in Virginia
Buildings and structures in Nelson County, Virginia